Under the Whyte notation for the classification of steam locomotives, 2-12-2 represents the wheel arrangement of two leading wheels on one axle (usually in a leading truck), twelve powered and coupled driving wheels on six axles, and two trailing wheels on one axle (usually in a trailing truck).

Equivalent classifications
Other equivalent classifications are:
UIC classification: 1F1 (also known as German classification and Italian classification)
French classification: 161
Turkish classification: 68
Swiss classification: 6/8

Use

Austria
The Deutsche Reichsbahn and later the Austrian Federal Railways operated two Class 97.4 2-12-2T tank locomotives, both built in 1941.

Indonesia
Hanomag and Werkspoor built a cumulative total of 28 JSS 800 class 2-12-2Ts (1F1 in UIC notation) for use by the Staatsspoorwegen in freight service in Java and Sumatra, Dutch East Indies, now Indonesia. They were assigned the railroad numbers 801-823 and H130-134. After Indonesian Independence, they were renumbered as F1001-F1026 by Indonesian State Railways.

United States
While the US did produce an 0-12-0 unit, and eventually eighty-eight 4-12-2 units for the Union Pacific, it did not produce 2-12-2 units.

References

12,2-12-2